Pycnomerus is a genus of ironclad beetles in the family Zopheridae. There are more than 20 described species in Pycnomerus.

Species
These 28 species belong to the genus Pycnomerus:

 Pycnomerus antennalis Hinton
 Pycnomerus arboreus Broun, 1885
 Pycnomerus arizonicus Stephan, 1989
 Pycnomerus biimpressus Reiter, 1877
 Pycnomerus borbonicus Dajoz, 1989
 Pycnomerus corpulentus (Reitter, 1877)
 Pycnomerus fuliginosus Erichson, 1842
 Pycnomerus haematodes (Fabricius, 1801)
 Pycnomerus inexpectus Jacquelin du Val, 1859
 Pycnomerus inexspectus Jacquelin du Val, 1858
 Pycnomerus infimus (Grouvelle, 1902)
 Pycnomerus italicus (Ganglbauer, 1899)
 Pycnomerus nevermanni Hinton
 Pycnomerus prebblei
 Pycnomerus quercus Stephan, 1989
 Pycnomerus reflexus (Say, 1826)
 Pycnomerus rimatara
 Pycnomerus rufescens Broun, 1882
 Pycnomerus rufipennis (Montrouzier, 1861)
 Pycnomerus sculpturatus Sharp, 1885
 Pycnomerus sexualis Hinton
 Pycnomerus sharpi Hetschko, 1928
 Pycnomerus simukovi Alekseev, 2015
 Pycnomerus stenosoma Champion
 Pycnomerus sulcicollis LeConte, 1863
 Pycnomerus thrinax Ivie & Slipinski, 2000
 Pycnomerus uniformis Ivie & Slipinski, 1989
 Pycnomerus valentinei Ivie & Slipinski

References

Further reading

External links

 

Zopheridae
Articles created by Qbugbot